Fritz Gromotka (2 June 1915 – 2 November 1979) was a Luftwaffe ace and recipient of the Knight's Cross of the Iron Cross during World War II.   Fritz Gromotka was credited with 29 aerial victories, 27 on the Western Front and 2 on the Eastern Front.

Career
Gromotka was born on 2 June 1915 in Kronschkow in the Prussian Province of Posen. In November 1940, he was posted to 6./JG 27, and during the Balkans Campaign of March–April 1941 claimed three victories over Greece, including two RAF Bristol Blenheim bombers of No. 211 Squadron on 13 April 1941.

Unteroffizier Gromotka participated in the invasion of the Soviet Union in June 1941, claiming two DB-3 twin-engine bombers shot down on 25 June 1941 near Wilna. While returning from this mission, he ran out of fuel and forced-landed his Bf 109 E-8 near Minsk. He returned to his unit on 28 June.

Gromotka was posted to North Africa with II./JG 27 in September 1941. He was shot down in combat on 21 May 1942, but was unhurt after crash-landing. By June 1942 he had claimed a further four victories over the Desert Air Force. In July 1942 Gromotka served as instructor at Jagdfliegerschule 4.

He returned to JG 27 in December 1942, with 9 staffel based in the Mediterranean theatre. From September to December 1943, Gromotka claimed another nine victories. He claimed a USAAF four-engine B-24 bomber on 5 October near Eratini.

In March 1944 III./JG 27 departed the Mediterranean for Reichsverteidigung duties and deployment in June to the Normandy Invasion front. Gromotka was commissioned to Leutnant and was awarded the Knight's Cross of the Iron Cross on 28 January 1945 for 29 victories.

On 1 February 1945, Gromotka was appointed Staffelkapitän of 9./JG 27, a position he held until the end of the war. Fritz Gromotka was credited with 29 victories in 438 missions, including 9 four-engine bombers. During his combat career Gromotka had had to bale out five times.

Gromotka died on 2 November 1979 at Remscheid.

Awards
 Aviator badge
 Front Flying Clasp of the Luftwaffe
 Ehrenpokal der Luftwaffe (19 January 1944)
 Iron Cross (1939)
 2nd Class
 1st Class
 German Cross in Gold on 25 May 1944 as Oberfeldwebel in the 9./Jagdgeschwader 27
 Knight's Cross of the Iron Cross on 28 January 1945 as Leutnant and Staffelkapitän of the 9./Jagdgeschwader 27

References

Citations

Bibliography

 
 
 
 
 

1915 births
1979 deaths
People from Kępno County
People from the Province of Posen
Luftwaffe pilots
German World War II flying aces
Recipients of the Gold German Cross
Recipients of the Knight's Cross of the Iron Cross